Adam Schaff (10 March 1913 – 12 November 2006) was a Polish Marxist philosopher.

Life
Of Jewish origin, Schaff was born in Lemberg (Lwow, Lviv) into a lawyer's family. Schaff studied economics at the Ecole des Sciences Politiques et Economiques in Paris, and philosophy in Poland, specializing in epistemology. In 1945 he received a philosophy degree at Moscow University, and in 1948 he returned to Warsaw University. He was considered the official ideologue of the Polish United Workers' Party, especially during its Stalinist period.
 
He was a member of the Polish Academy of Sciences and of the Club of Rome.

Works
 Word and Concept 
 Language and Cognition 
 Introduction to Semantic
 Problems of the Marxist Theory of Truth
 A Philosophy of Man
Several of Schaff's works were translated into German by Witold Leder.

External links
 Adam Schaff (1913-2006) - Necrology

See also

 History of philosophy in Poland
 Marxism

References

1913 births
2006 deaths
Writers from Lviv
Marxist theorists
20th-century Polish philosophers
Jewish philosophers
20th-century Polish Jews
Jewish socialists
Polish United Workers' Party members
Academic staff of the University of Warsaw
Recipients of the State Award Badge (Poland)